Jogeswar Singh Laisram is an Indian politician. He was a Member of Parliament, representing Inner Manipur in the Lok Sabha the lower house of India's Parliament.

References

External links
 Official biographical sketch in Parliament of India website

Indian National Congress politicians
Lok Sabha members from Manipur
India MPs 1952–1957
1912 births
Year of death missing